Wayne Morgan (born 1 August 1965) is a New Zealand cyclist. He competed in the road race at the 1988 Summer Olympics.

References

External links
 

1965 births
Living people
New Zealand male cyclists
Olympic cyclists of New Zealand
Cyclists at the 1988 Summer Olympics
Sportspeople from Lower Hutt
20th-century New Zealand people